Madame Margaret LaFolier House, also known as the Ludwig House, was a historic home located near Huntington in Huntington County, Indiana. It was built in the 1830s, and was a two-story, Greek Revival style frame dwelling. It has been demolished.

It was listed on the National Register of Historic Places in 1982 and delisted in 1990.

References

Former National Register of Historic Places in Indiana
National Register of Historic Places in Huntington County, Indiana
Greek Revival houses in Indiana
Houses completed in 1830
Houses in Huntington County, Indiana
Houses on the National Register of Historic Places in Indiana